Mr. Bean is a fictional character from the British comedy television programme Mr. Bean, its animated spin-off, and two live-action feature films. He was created and portrayed by Rowan Atkinson and made his first appearance on television in the pilot episode which first aired on 1 January 1990.

Overview
Mr. Bean lives in Flat 2, 12 Arbour Road, Highbury, London, England. His first name and his profession, if any, are never mentioned; he introduces himself simply as "Bean." In the first film adaptation, Bean, "Mr." appears on his passport in the "first name" field, and he is shown employed as a guard at London's National Gallery. His date of birth is given variously as 15 September 1956, or as 6 January 1955 (the latter being Rowan Atkinson's actual date of birth).

At the beginning of episode two onwards, Mr. Bean falls from the sky in a beam of light, accompanied by a choir singing Ecce homo qui est faba ("Behold the man who is a bean"), recorded by Southwark Cathedral Choir. These opening sequences were initially in black and white in episodes two and three, and were intended by the producers to show his status as an "ordinary man cast into the spotlight". However, later episodes showed Mr. Bean dropping from the night sky in a deserted London street against the backdrop of St Paul's Cathedral. At the end of episodes three and six he is also shown being sucked right back up into the sky in the respective background scenes (black scene in episode 3 and street scene in episode 6). Atkinson has acknowledged that Mr. Bean "has an alien aspect to him". In the animated series (episode, "Double Trouble") he is taken inside a spacecraft with "aliens" who look exactly like him and even have their own plushy toys. In an obvious homage, the aliens send him back home in a beam of light and music similar to the opening of the original Mr. Bean series.

Clothing
Mr. Bean wears a brown tweed jacket, a white shirt, a thin red tie, brown trousers, black shoes and a black digital calculator watch. He occasionally changes his outfit to suit the scene he is in.

In the episode "The Return of Mr. Bean", when Bean is heading to a fancy restaurant to celebrate his birthday, he wears a grey suit with a dark red tie. In the same episode he wears a tuxedo. In the episode "The Curse of Mr. Bean", when Bean is heading for the park to make a sandwich for his lunch, he wears a long dark green overcoat with a light green shirt and a dark green tie. In the same episode when Bean goes to watch a horror film with his girlfriend, he is wearing his trademark clothes but with a light colored brown sweater instead of his trademark brown tweed jacket.

Personality

Mr. Bean is immature, self-absorbed, extremely competitive and brings various abnormal schemes and contrivances to everyday tasks. He rarely speaks, and when he does, it is normally only a few mumbled words which are in a comically low-pitched voice. Mr. Bean often seems unmindful of basic aspects of the way the world works, and the programme typically features his attempts at what would generally be considered simple activities, such as going for a swim, using a television set, redecorating, or attending church. The humour largely comes from his original (and often absurd) solutions to problems – usually self-inflicted – and his total disregard for others when solving them, his pettiness and occasional malevolence.

Influences
Atkinson cited the earlier comedy character Monsieur Hulot, created by French comedian and director Jacques Tati, as an influence on the character. Atkinson also cited the influence of Peter Sellers, who had previously played similar "fumbling fool" characters, notably Hrundi Bakshi in The Party (1968) and Inspector Clouseau in The Pink Panther films.

Appearances

Mr. Bean is the main character of both the titular TV series and its animated spin-off, as well as of feature films based on the series, Bean (1997) and Mr. Bean's Holiday (2007). Bean also made guest appearances at the London 2012 Olympics opening ceremony and in the 2017 Chinese film Top Funny Comedian: The Movie. Atkinson also portrayed Bean in several sketches for Comic Relief and also in television advertisements throughout the years such as REMA 1000, M&M's, Fujifilm, Nissan Tino, Snickers  and most recently for Etisalat in 2019.

References

External links
 Mr. Bean official website
 Mr. Bean on IMDb

Mr. Bean
British sitcom characters
Comedy television characters
Comedy film characters
Television characters introduced in 1990
Fictional people from London
Rowan Atkinson
Internet memes